FC Chavdar is a Bulgarian football club based in Etropole, Sofia Province. Founded in 1922, they compete in the South-West Third League, the third tier of Bulgarian football. They play their home games at the Chavdar Stadium, which now boasts a capacity of 5,600. Their home colours are red and white.

Chavdar have spent the majority of their playing history between the third and fourth tiers of the Bulgarian football league system. They achieved promotion to the second tier in 2007 following a win against Botev Vratsa in the play-off. The following season, they achieved their highest league finish in club history, ending the season 3rd in the Bulgarian Second Division.

In 2009–10 season, as a second league team, Chavdar contested the Bulgarian Cup Semi-final for the only time in their history, losing 1–0 against Beroe.

History 
The club was established in 1922 with the name "Balkan". In 1945 the club was renamed "Peyo Krinchev". Between 1957 and 1985 the club was named DFS "Etropole". Since 1985 the name is "Chavdar". The main kit-colours of the team are red and white. In his history the club participated in either the second or the third Bulgarian division. Currently the team is playing in the West B PFG. In 2007/2008 season Chavdar finishes 3rd in the Bulgarian South-West V AFG, and wins promotion for the 2008/2009 season.

The club qualified for the 1/16 finals of the Bulgarian Cup 1972-73 after defeating Botev Vratsa and for the 1/8 finals in 2007-08 after defeating PFC Haskovo and beating surprisingly elite Marek Dupnitsa with 5:3 (after penalty kicks) to make it to the 1/8 finals of the competition. There "Chavdar" was eliminated by the Kaliakra Kavarna after suffering a 2:0 loss.
On 31 March 2010, Chavdar reached the semi-finals of the Bulgarian Cup for the first time in their history - the team from Etropole eliminated higher echelon Slavia Sofia after a penalty shootout (the score at the end of extra time was 0:0, the hosts won 4:2 in the kicks from the spot contest). They lost in the next round against Beroe by a score of 0:1.

The team was dissolved in 2013, but restored again in the year 2014, starting from A Regional Group, the 4th league in Bulgarian football.

Honours
 Third place in the Western "B" group: 2007/08
 Semifinalist in the National Cup tournament: this time its official name is the Cup of Bulgaria - 2009 / 10

Current squad

League positions

Past seasons

Managers

References

External links 
 Official website 
 Club Profile at bgclubs.eu

Football clubs in Bulgaria
1922 establishments in Bulgaria
Association football clubs established in 1922